Sir John Stewart, 1st Baronet may refer to:

 Sir John Stewart, 1st Baronet, of Athenree (c.1758–1825), Member of Parliament (MP) for Tyrone 1802–1806 and 1812–1825
 Sir John Stewart, 1st Baronet, of Fingask (1877–1924), Scottish whisky distiller

See also 
 John Stewart (disambiguation)